Longir-e Olya (also Romanized as  Longīr-e ‘Olyā and Longīr ‘Olyā; also known as Longīr, Longīr-e Bālā, and Lunjir) is a village in Dorunak Rural District, Zeydun District, Behbahan County, Khuzestan Province, Iran. At the 2006 census, its population was 628, in 142 families.

References 

Populated places in Behbahan County